Babina Luka is a village in the municipality of Valjevo, Serbia. According to the 2002 census, the village has a population of 772 people.

Notable people
Hadži-Ruvim
Petar Nikolajević Moler

References

Populated places in Kolubara District